Thomas Dickson may refer to:

Thomas Dickson (athlete) (born 1974), Saint Vincent track and field sprinter
Thomas Dickson (Upper Canada politician) (c 1775–1825), Upper Canada businessman and political figure
Thomas Dickson (Nova Scotia politician) (1791–1855), Nova Scotia lawyer and political figure
Thomas Dickson (industrialist) (1822–1884), industrialist, founder of The Dickson Manufacturing Company, president of the Delaware and Hudson Railway
Tom Dickson (figure skater), American figure skater
Tom Dickson (Georgia politician) (born 1945), state representative from Georgia
Tom Dickson (Australian footballer) (1888–1958), Australian rules footballer 
Tom Dickson, creator of Blendtec and its Will It Blend? advertising campaign
Tommy Dickson (1929–2007), Northern Irish footballer
Thomas Law Dickson (ca 1769 – after 1810), farmer, judge and politician in Nova Scotia
Thomas Dickson (Scottish politician) (1885–1935), Member of Parliament for Lanark, 1923–1924 and 1929–1931
Thomas Alexander Dickson (1833–1909), Member of Parliament for Dungannon 1874–1880, Tyrone 1881–1885, and Dublin St Stephen's Green 1888–1892
Thomas Elder Dickson (1899–1978), Scottish artist
Thomas Dickson (antiquary) (1825–1904) Scottish antiquary and philanthropist
Thomas Dickson (architect), architect in Worcester about 1864
Thomas Dickson (Ballyshannon MP) (1741–1817), Irish Member of Parliament for Ballyshannon 1790–98

See also
Thomas Dixson (1733–1809), soldier and politician in Nova Scotia
Thomas Dickson Archibald (1813–1890), Canadian businessman and politician
Thomas Dixon (disambiguation)